A chord chart (or chart) is a form of musical notation that describes the basic harmonic and rhythmic information for a song or tune. It is the most common form of notation used by professional session musicians playing jazz or popular music. It is intended primarily for a rhythm section (usually consisting of piano, guitar, drums and bass). In these genres the musicians are expected to be able to improvise the individual notes used for the chords (the "voicing") and the appropriate ornamentation, counter melody or bassline.

In some chord charts, the harmony is given as a series of chord symbols above a traditional musical staff. The rhythmic information can be very specific and written using a form of traditional notation, sometimes called rhythmic notation, or it can be completely unspecified using slash notation, allowing the musician to fill the bar with chords or fills any way they see fit (called comping). In Nashville notation the key is left unspecified on the chart by substituting numbers for chord names. This facilitates on-the-spot key changes to songs. Chord charts may also include explicit parts written in modern music notation (such as a musical riff that the song is dependent on for character), lyrics or lyric fragments, and various other information to help the musician compose and play their part.

Rhythmic notation

Rhythmic notation specifies the exact rhythm in which to play or comp the indicated chords. The chords are written above the staff and the rhythm is indicated in the traditional manner, though pitch is unspecified through the use of slashes placed on the center line instead of notes. This is contrasted with the less specific slash notation.

Slash notation

Slash notation is a form of purposefully vague musical notation which indicates or requires that an accompaniment player or players improvise their own rhythm pattern or comp according to the chord symbol given above the staff. On the staff a slash is placed on each beat (so that there are four slashes per measure in 4/4 time).

Slash notation and rhythmic notation may both be used in the same piece, for example, with the more specific rhythmic notation used in a section where the horn section is playing a specific melody or rhythmic figure that the pianist must support, and with slash notation written for the pianist for use underneath improvised solos.

Nashville notation

Nashville notation or Nashville Number System is a method of writing, or sketching out, musical ideas, using numbers in place of chord names.  For example, in the key of C major, the chord D minor seventh can be written as "2−7", "2m7", or "ii7". "The musicians in Nashville use the Nashville Number System almost exclusively for conveying a song's structure and arrangement in the recording studio."

In the key of C, C=1, D=2, E=3, and so on for all seven notes in the key. Similarly, in the key of G, G=1, A=2, B=3, and so on up to F=7.  So, the chord progression C///F///G///C/// in the key of C would correspond to 1///4///5///1/// in Nashville notation, while G///C///D///G/// in the key of G would also become 1///4///5///1///.

This method of notation allows musicians who are familiar with basic music theory to play the same song in any key, as does Roman numeral analysis.

Grid notation

In some European countries (France particularly), pop and jazz musicians often use so-called "chord grids" that show in a graphical way the chord progression. To illustrate, below is an example of two-part tunes, each eight bars long. Each square stands for a bar, while the "•/•”symbol means to stay on the same chord as the previous bar. The song structure can then be written down as a succession of the different parts. For example A-A-B-A, that would mean to play twice the "A" part, once the "B" part, and then again once the "A" part.

Squares can also be separated diagonally for bars having two chords, as in the example below:

Chord charts in computer files

Chord charts can be represented in a schematic way as ASCII files, where bar lines are given as pipe symbols "|", chord symbols are approximated as text and beats may be indicated with a forward slash "/".

In this context, the term "chord chart" is also used to describe a lyric sheet where chord symbols are placed above the appropriate syllables of the lyrics to associate the relative timing of the chord changes to the words of a song, or it may refer to the handwritten lyrics with chords handwritten above them.

See also
Chord notation
Chord progression
Lead sheet

References

Musical notation
Accompaniment
Chords
Jazz terminology